Nairne may be:

 Nairne, South Australia
 Nairne railway station, the former railway station located in the South Australian town of Nairne
 Lord Nairne
 Lady Nairne (disambiguation)
 Nairne Baronets
 Nairne (surname)